"The Story of Us" is a song written and recorded by American singer-songwriter Taylor Swift for her third studio album, Speak Now (2010). It was sent to US pop radio on April 19, 2011, as the fourth single from the album. Produced by Swift and Nathan Chapman, the track combines pop-punk, dance-pop, and power pop, with a production consisting of fast-paced drums and dynamic electric guitars. For the lyrics, which are about the awkwardness between two parted lovers, Swift was inspired by her encounter with an ex-boyfriend at an awards show.

In contemporary reviews, music critics praised the uptempo production, but a few commented that it is indiscernible from other radio-friendly pop songs. The single peaked at number 41 on the US Billboard Hot 100 and number 70 on the Canadian Hot 100. It also reached the top 30 on Billboard airplay charts including Adult Contemporary and Mainstream Top 40. It was certified platinum by the Recording Industry Association of America (RIAA) for surpassing one million digital units.

Noble Jones directed the song's music video, which was filmed at Vanderbilt University in Nashville, Tennessee, and premiered on May 24, 2011. In the video, Swift and her ex-boyfriend, both college students, try to avoid each other when they are in the same library together. Swift performed the track on The Ellen DeGeneres Show and included it in the setlist of the Speak Now World Tour (2011–2012).

Background and release
American singer-songwriter Taylor Swift began work on her third studio album, Speak Now (2010), two years prior to its release. According to Swift, the album is a collection of songs about the things she had wanted to but could not make to the people she had met in real life. "The Story of Us" was inspired by her encounter with an ex-boyfriend at an awards show. Even though she wanted to strike a conversation with him, she was unable to do so because of the awkwardness she felt. Upon returning home, she told her mother, "I felt like I was standing alone in a crowded room," and then proceeded to write the lyrics. "The Story of Us" was the last track Swift wrote for Speak Now. In an interview with Brian Mansfield for USA Today, Swift said that the subject behind "The Story of Us" was also that behind "Dear John", another Speak Now track.

Before the album's release, Xfinity premiered a preview of "The Story of Us" on October 22, 2010. The song was released as a single to US pop radio on April 19, 2011, by Big Machine Records. A limited-edition CD single was released exclusively through Swift's online store. It was later included in another package that was exclusive to Swift's official store; the package includes the Target exclusive deluxe edition of Speak Now, a free pair of headphones, and one of the three singles for "Sparks Fly", "The Story of Us", or "Mean" CD single.

Composition

"The Story of Us" is four minutes and 28 seconds long. In contemporary reviews, music critics categorized the song as pop-punk, dance-pop, and power pop. It has a prominent uptempo pop production incorporating dynamic electric guitars, fast-paced drums, and a post-punk disco beat. Some critics, including Matt Bjorke from Roughstock and Brittany McKenna from Billboard, commented that "The Story of Us" is one of the many Speak Now tracks that lean towards pop music departing from Swift's country-music image.

Lyrically, the song is about the awkwardness between two people after they break up. In the narrative, the protagonist and the love interest both attempt to ignore each other while being close in proximity. The protagonist presents each verse as "chapters" in a story, and as the song proceeds, it turns into a "tragedy". Chris Willman of Yahoo! Music thought the key lyrics of the song are "I'd tell you I miss you but I don't know how / I've never heard silence quite this loud," and "I would lay my armor down, if you would say you'd rather love than fight." Leah Greenblatt of Entertainment Weekly considered the lines, "I used to know my place was the spot next to you / Now I'm searching the room for an empty seat / 'Cause lately I don't even know what page you're on," as one of the best lyrics on Speak Now. In PopMatters, Heaton observed that Swift's exploration of the disconnect between fantasy and real life on "The Story of Us" represents the central theme of Speak Now, where she learned to face the disappointment of real life.

Reception
In Speak Now album reviews, some critics were not impressed with the pop-leaning production of "The Story of Us" and commented that the album's strength is the country-leaning songs that play to Swift's strengths. Some others were more receptive, noting the mature perspective departing from the idealistic notion of adolescent romance on Swift's previous album, Fearless (2008). Slant Magazine Jonathan Keefe, on the contrary, opined that the romantic theme of "The Story of Us", as well as other Speak Now tracks, confined Swift's artistic persona within love and relationships with men, and thus limited her songwriting ability.

On a more positive side, Amanda Hensel of Taste of Country praised the radio-friendly uptempo production. Theon Weber of The Village Voice described the track as "giddy and bombastic". Pitchfork Sam Sodomsky appreciated the lyrics for displaying Swift's songwriting with specific details resulting in universal feelings. In The Arizona Republic, Ed Masley deemed it one of Swift's catchiest and most relatable singles. Josh Kurp from Uproxx ranked "The Story of Us" second on his 2021 ranking of all songs in Swift's discography, particularly praising the production and lyrics.

Following the release of Speak Now, "The Story of Us" debuted at number 41 (which was its peak position) on the US Billboard Hot 100 chart dated November 13, 2010. Following its single release, the song re-entered Billboard Hot 100 at number 98 on the week ending May 28, 2011 and reached number 66 on the week ending June 25, 2011. On Billboard airplay charts, the single peaked within the top 30 of the Mainstream Top 40 (21) and Adult Contemporary (23) charts. It was certified platinum by the Recording Industry Association of America (RIAA) for surpassing one million digital units. Elsewhere, "The Story of Us" peaked at number 70 on the Canadian Hot 100, 33 on the Mahasz chart in Hungary, and 15 on the Ultratip chart in Belgian Flanders.

Live performances

Swift performed "The Story of Us" for an NBC Speak Now Thanksgiving Special, which broadcast on November 25, 2010. The television special showcased the making of the album along with live performances on a rooftop in New York City. On April 5, 2011, Swift performed an acoustic version of "The Story of Us" for BBC Radio 1's Live Lounge, where she also covered Mumford & Sons' song "White Blank Page" from their album Sigh No More. After its single release, she sang "The Story of Us" on The Ellen DeGeneres Show in May 2011. On the Speak Now World Tour (2011–2012), Swift included it in the setlist. The performance was recorded and released on Swift's live album, Speak Now World Tour – Live (2011). On September 8, 2018, she played the song as a "surprise song" at the Kansas City show of her Reputation Stadium Tour.

Music video
The music video for "The Story of Us" was directed by Noble Jones, starring Swift (as protagonist) and Caleb Campbell (as the ex-boyfriend). Media outlets reported that the video was filmed at Vanderbilt University in Nashville. Prior to the release of the video, Universal Music Group released a promotional music video featuring the European leg of Swift's Speak Now World Tour. In the video, Swift plays a college student. MTV previewed the video on May 20, 2011. The video, as well as an interview with Swift, premiered on MTV four days later. During the interview, Swift said that the video shoot encountered some problems since tornadoes were hitting Nashville. She also said that although all of her previous music videos ended with happy endings, the narrative of "The Story of Us" does not.

In the video, Swift is seen performing while standing in a library, sitting on a desk, and lying across a table with a stack of books next to her. Throughout the video, scenes of her and her ex-boyfriend are juxtaposed with those of the band playing. Swift chooses a seat in the library, but after finding her ex sitting across the table from her, she hides behind a book then looks away, pulling on her clothes and plays with her hair in an attempt to go unnoticed. Unbeknownst to her, he has noticed her and attempts to avoid her as well. The video ends with the students in the library dancing to the song, as Swift and her ex arrive face to face with each other, but eventually they both shrug and walk away.

Some media noticed that the college setting of "The Story of Us" marked a departure from Swift's previous high school-themed music videos. Taste of Country Amanda Hensel noted that the video's tone is less bright and more somber than that of Swift's previous ones. Kyle Anderson of Entertainment Weekly praised the video for being "a lovely and clever bit of film for Swift" and deemed it a sequel to the music video of "You Belong with Me" (2009), a high school-themed video about an unrequited love.

Charts

Certifications

References

2011 singles
2010 songs
Songs written by Taylor Swift
Taylor Swift songs
Song recordings produced by Nathan Chapman (record producer)
Big Machine Records singles
American pop punk songs
American power pop songs
Song recordings produced by Taylor Swift